AS Solidarité is a Gabonese football club based in Port-Gentil, Gabon. The club currently plays in Gabon Championnat National D1

Stadium

Currently the team plays at the 7,000 capacity Stade Pierre Claver Divounguy.

League participations

Gabon Championnat National D1: 2011–
Gabon Second Division: ????–2011

External links
  
 

Football clubs in Gabon